Betty Boop is an animated cartoon character created by Max Fleischer, with help from animators including Grim Natwick. She originally appeared in the Talkartoon and Betty Boop film series, which were produced by Fleischer Studios and released by Paramount Pictures. She was featured in 90 theatrical cartoons between 1930 and 1939. She has also been featured in comic strips and mass merchandising. 

A caricature of a Jazz Age flapper, Betty Boop was described in a 1934 court case as "combin[ing] in appearance the childish with the sophisticated—a large round baby face with big eyes and a nose like a button, framed in a somewhat careful coiffure, with a very small body of which perhaps the leading characteristic is the most self-confident little bust imaginable". Although she was toned down in the mid-1930s as a result of the Hays Code to appear more demure, she became one of the world's best-known and most popular cartoon characters.

History

Origins
Betty Boop made her first appearance in the cartoon Dizzy Dishes, released on August 9, 1930, the seventh installment in Fleischer's Talkartoon series. Inspired by a popular performing style, but not by any one specific person, the character was originally created as an anthropomorphic French poodle. Clara Bow is often given credit as being the inspiration for Boop, though Fleischer told his artists that he wanted a caricature of singer Helen Kane, who performed in a style shared by many performers of the day–Kane was also the one who sued Fleischer over the signature "Boop Oop a Doop" line. Betty Boop appeared as a supporting character in ten cartoons as a flapper girl with more heart than brains. In individual cartoons, she was called "Nancy Lee" or "Nan McGrew"—derived from the Helen Kane film Dangerous Nan McGrew (1930)—usually serving as a girlfriend to studio star Bimbo.

Within a year, Betty made the transition from an incidental human-canine breed to a completely human female character. While much credit has been given to Grim Natwick for helping to transform Max Fleischer's creation, her transition into the cute cartoon girl was also in part due to the work of Berny Wolf, Otto Feuer, Seymour Kneitel, "Doc" Crandall, Willard Bowsky, and James "Shamus" Culhane. By the release of Any Rags, Betty Boop was forever established as a human character. Her floppy poodle ears became hoop earrings, and her black poodle nose became a girl's button-like nose.

Betty was first voiced by Margie Hines. Later, several different voice actresses performed the role, including Kate Wright, Bonnie Poe, Ann Rothschild (also known as Little Ann Little), and especially Mae Questel, who began voicing Betty Boop in Bimbo's Silly Scandals (1931), and continued with the role until 1938, returning 50 years later in Disney's Who Framed Roger Rabbit (1988). Today, Betty is voiced by Sandy Fox and Cindy Robinson.

Although Betty's first name was assumed to have been established in the 1931 Screen Songs cartoon Betty Co-ed, this "Betty" is a different character, which the official Betty Boop website describes as a "prototype" of Betty Boop. At least 12 Screen Songs cartoons featured Betty Boop or a similar character.

Betty appeared in the first "Color Classic" cartoon Poor Cinderella, her only theatrical color appearance in 1934. In the film, she was depicted with red hair as opposed to her typical black hair.

Betty Boop was the star of the Talkartoons by 1932 and was given her own series that same year, beginning with Stopping the Show. From that point on, she was crowned "The Queen of the Animated Screen". The series was popular throughout the 1930s, lasting until 1939. 

Since the character was created by an Austrian Jew and eventually voiced by a Jewish actress, Mae Questel, animation fans sometimes try to pinpoint various aspects that hint at Betty's Jewishness. The 1932 Talkartoon Minnie the Moocher featured the one and only appearance of Betty's parents: a strict immigrant couple, who get upset that Betty does not want to eat the traditional German foods hasenpfeffer (rabbit stew) and sauerbraten. Benjamin Ivry says that this evidence is ambiguous, as these are not kosher foods, and  the accents of the parents are comical German accents, rather than Jewish.

Contemporary resurgence
The Betty Boop films were revived after Paramount sold them for syndication in 1955. UM&M and National Telefilm Associates were required to remove the original Paramount logo from the opening and closing, as well as any references to Paramount in the copyright line on the main titles. However, the mountain motif remains on some television prints, usually with a UM&M copyright line, while recent versions have circulated with the Paramount-Publix reference in cartoons from 1931.

The original Betty Boop cartoons were made in black and white. As new color cartoons made specifically for television began to appear in the 1960s, the original black-and-white cartoons were retired. Boop's film career had a revival with the release of The Betty Boop Scandals of 1974, becoming a part of the post-1960s counterculture. NTA attempted to capitalize on this with a new syndication package, but because no market existed for cartoons in black and white, they sent them to South Korea, where the cartoons were hand-traced frame-by-frame in color, resulting in the degradation of the animation quality and timing. Unable to sell these to television largely because of the sloppy colorization, they assembled a number of the color cartoons in a compilation feature titled Betty Boop for President, to connect with the 1976 election, but it did not receive a theatrical release.

The release of the films on video cassette for home viewing created a new market for the films in their original form. The American Movie Classics cable television channel showcased a selection of the original black-and-white Betty Boop cartoons in the 1990s, which led to an eight-volume VHS and LV set, Betty Boop, the Definitive Collection. Some of the nonpublic-domain Boop cartoons copyrighted by Republic successor Melange Pictures (ViacomCBS's holding company that handles the Republic theatrical library) have been released by Olive Films under Paramount's license, while the Internet Archive currently hosts 22 Betty Boop cartoons that are now public domain.

Planned feature appearances
In 1993, plans were made for an animated feature film of Betty Boop, but they were later cancelled. The musical storyboard scene of the proposed film can be seen online. The finished reel consists of Betty and her estranged father performing a jazz number together called "Where are you?" Jimmy Rowles and Sue Raney provide the vocals for Betty and Benny Boop.

Producers Steven Paul Leiva and Jerry Rees began production on a new Betty Boop feature film for the Zanuck Company and Metro-Goldwyn-Mayer. The script by Rees detailed Betty's rise in Hollywood in the Golden Age of Hollywood. It was to be a musical with music by jazz musician Bennie Wallace and lyrics by Cheryl Ernst Wells. Wallace and Wells had completed several songs and 75% of the film had been storyboarded when, two weeks before voice recording was to begin with Bernadette Peters as Betty, the head of MGM, Alan Ladd Jr., was replaced by Frank Mancuso, and the project was abandoned.

On August 14, 2014,  Simon Cowell's Syco and Animal Logic announced they were developing and producing a feature-length film based on the character.

According to Playbill in 2012, a musical based on Betty Boop was "in the works", with music by David Foster and book by Oscar Williams and Sally Robinson. No dates, theatre, or cast were listed.

Portrayal

Sex symbol

Betty Boop is regarded as one of the first and best-known sex symbols on the animated screen; she is a symbol of the Depression era and a reminder of the more carefree days of Jazz Age flappers. Her popularity was drawn largely from adult audiences, and the cartoons, while seemingly surreal, contained many sexual and psychological elements, particularly in the 1932 "Talkartoon" Minnie the Moocher (1932), featuring Cab Calloway and his orchestra.

Minnie the Moocher defined Betty's character as a teenager of a modern era, at odds with the old-world ways of her parents. In the cartoon, after a disagreement with her strict parents, Betty runs away from home, accompanied by her boyfriend Bimbo, only to get lost in a haunted cave. A ghostly walrus (rotoscoped from live-action footage of Calloway) sings Calloway's song "Minnie the Moocher", accompanied by several other ghosts and skeletons. This haunting performance sends the frightened Betty and Bimbo back to the safety of home. "Minnie the Moocher" served as a promotion for Calloway's subsequent stage appearances and also established Betty Boop as a cartoon star. The eight Talkartoons that followed all starred Betty, leading her into her own series beginning in 1932. With the release of Stopping the Show (August 1932), the Talkartoons were replaced by the Betty Boop series, which continued for the next seven years.

Betty Boop was unique among female cartoon characters because she represented a sexual woman. Other female cartoon characters of the same period, such as Minnie Mouse, displayed their underwear or bloomers regularly, in the style of childish or comical characters, not a fully defined woman's form. Many other female cartoons were merely clones of their male co-stars, with alterations in costume, the addition of eyelashes, and a female voice. Betty Boop wore short dresses, high heels, a garter, and her breasts were highlighted with a low, contoured bodice that showed cleavage. In her cartoons, male characters frequently try to sneak a peek at her while she is changing or simply going about her business. In Betty Boop's Bamboo Isle, she does the hula wearing nothing but a lei, strategically placed to cover her breasts, and a grass skirt. This was repeated in her first cameo appearance in Popeye the Sailor (1933). A certain girlish quality was given to the character. She was drawn with a head more similar to a baby's than an adult's in proportion to her body. This suggested the combination of girlishness and maturity that many people saw in the flapper type, which Betty represented.

While the character was kept pure and girl-like onscreen, compromises to her virtue were a challenge. The studio's 1931 Christmas card featured Betty in bed with Santa Claus, winking at the viewer. The Talkartoons The Bum Bandit and Dizzy Red Riding Hood (both 1931) were given distinctly "impure" endings. Officially, Betty was only 16 years old, according to a 1932 interview with Fleischer (although in The Bum Bandit, she is portrayed as a married woman with many children and with an adult woman's voice, rather than the standard "boop-boop-a-doop" voice).

Attempts to compromise her virginity were reflected in Chess-Nuts (1932) and most importantly in Boop-Oop-a-Doop (1932). In Chess-Nuts, the Black King goes into the house where Betty is and ties her up. When she rejects him, he pulls her out of the ropes, drags her off to the bedroom and says, "I will have you". The bed, however, runs away, and Betty calls for help through the window. Bimbo comes to her rescue, and she is saved before anything happens. In Boop-Oop-a-Doop, Betty is a high-wire performer in a circus. The ringmaster lusts for Betty as he watches her from below, singing "Do Something", a song previously performed by Helen Kane. As Betty returns to her tent, the ringmaster follows her inside and sensually massages her legs, surrounds her, and threatens her job if she does not submit. Betty pleads with the ringmaster to cease his advances, as she sings "Don't Take My Boop-Oop-A-Doop Away". Koko the Clown is practicing his juggling outside the tent and overhears the struggle inside. He leaps in to save Betty, struggling with the ringmaster, who loads him into a cannon and fires it. Koko, who remained hiding inside the cannon, knocks the ringmaster out cold with a mallet, while imitating the ringmaster's laugh. Koko then inquires about Betty's welfare, to which she answers in song, "No, he couldn't take my boop-oop-a-doop away". According to Jill Harness of Mental Floss, these portrayals of Boop fighting off sexual harassment on the animated screen made many see her as a feminist icon.

Under the Production Code
Betty Boop's best appearances are considered to be in her first three years due to her "Jazz Baby" character and innocent sexuality, which was aimed at adults, but the content of her films was affected by the National Legion of Decency and the Production Code of 1934, which imposed guidelines on the motion-picture industry and placed specific restrictions on the content films could reference with sexual innuendos. This greatly affected the Betty Boop cartoons.

No longer a carefree flapper from the date the code went into effect on July 1, 1934, Betty became a spinster housewife or a career girl who wore a fuller dress or skirt. Additionally, as time progressed, the curls in her hair gradually decreased in number. She also eventually stopped wearing her gold bracelets and hoop earrings, and she became more mature and wiser in personality, compared to her earlier years. Right from the start, Joseph Breen, the new head film censor, had numerous complaints. Breen ordered the removal of the suggestive introduction that had started the cartoons because Betty Boop's winks and shaking hips were deemed "suggestive of immorality". For a few entries, Betty was given a new human boyfriend named Freddy, who was introduced in She Wronged Him Right (1934). Next, Betty was teamed with a puppy named Pudgy, beginning with Betty Boop's Little Pal (1934). The following year saw the addition of the eccentric inventor Grampy, who debuted in Betty Boop and Grampy (1935).

While these cartoons were tame compared to her earlier appearances, their self-conscious wholesomeness was aimed at a more juvenile audience, which contributed to the decline of the series. Much of the decline was due to the lessening of Betty's role in the cartoons in favor of her co-stars, not to mention Fleischer's biggest success, Popeye. This was a similar problem experienced during the same period with Walt Disney's Mickey Mouse, who was becoming eclipsed by the popularity of his co-stars Donald Duck, Goofy, and Pluto.

Since she was largely a musical novelty character, the animators attempted to keep Betty's cartoons interesting by pairing her with popular comic strip characters such as Henry, The Little King and Little Jimmy, hoping to create an additional spin-off series with her pairing with Popeye in 1933. None of these films, though, generated a new series. When the flapper/jazz era that Betty represented had been replaced by the big bands of the swing era, Fleischer Studios made an attempt to develop a replacement character in this style in the 1938 Betty Boop cartoon Betty Boop and Sally Swing, but it was not a success.

The last Betty Boop cartoons were released in 1939, and a few made attempts to bring Betty into the swing era. In her last appearance, Rhythm on the Reservation (1939), Betty drives an open convertible, labeled "Betty Boop's Swing Band", through a Native American reservation, where she introduces the people to swing music and creates a "Swinging Sioux Band". The Betty Boop cartoon series officially ended with Yip Yip Yippy (1939). While Yip Yip Yippy appears at the end of the Betty Boop series, it is actually a one-shot about a "Drug Store" mail-order cowboy "wannabe" without Betty, which was written mainly to fill the release schedule and fulfill the contract.

Media

Television
In 1955, Betty's 110 cartoon appearances were sold to television syndicator UM&M, which was acquired by National Telefilm Associates (NTA) in 1956. NTA was reorganized in 1985 as Republic Pictures, which folded in 2012, and became Melange Pictures, a subsidiary of Paramount Global, the parent company of Paramount. Paramount, Boop's original home studio (via Melange/Paramount Global), now acts as a theatrical distributor for the Boop cartoons that they originally released. Television rights are now handled on Paramount's behalf by Trifecta Entertainment & Media, which in turn were inherited from CBS Television Distribution (now currently renamed as CBS Media Ventures since 2021), successor to various related companies, including Worldvision Enterprises, Republic Pictures Television, and NTA.

Betty Boop appeared in two television specials, The Romance of Betty Boop in 1985, which was produced by Lee Mendelson and Bill Melendez, the same creative team behind the Peanuts specials, and 1989's The Betty Boop Movie Mystery; both specials are available on DVD as part of the Advantage Cartoon Mega Pack. While television revivals were conceived, nothing has materialized from the plans. Her last television appearance was an episode of Project Runaway All Stars in February 2018.

On February 11, 2016, Deadline announced that a new 26-episode television series focusing on Betty Boop is in production, in partnership with Normaal Animation, Fleischer Studios, and King Features. The show was to be aimed towards the tween and teenaged audiences. The show's premise, according to the article, will "recount the daily struggles, joys, and victories of young Betty Boop, who has every intention of being on stage and becoming a superstar".

Home media
While the animated cartoons featuring Betty Boop have enjoyed renewed attention over the last 30 years, official home-video releases have been limited to the VHS and LaserDisc collector's sets in the 1990s. No such releases for the Betty Boop cartoons on DVD and Blu-ray were made until 2013, when Olive Films, under license from Paramount Home Entertainment, finally released the nonpublic domain cartoons, although they were restored from the original television internegatives that carried the altered opening and closing credits. Volume 1 was released on August 20, 2013, and volume 2 on September 24, 2013. Volume 3 was released on April 29, 2014, and volume 4 on September 30, 2014.

Comics
The Betty Boop comic strip by Bud Counihan (assisted by Fleischer staffer Hal Seeger) was distributed by King Features Syndicate from July 23, 1934, to November 28, 1937. From November 19, 1984 to January 31, 1988, a revival strip with Felix the Cat, Betty Boop and Felix, was produced by Mort Walker's sons Brian, Neal, Greg, and Morgan. In 1990, First Comics published Betty Boop's Big Break, a 52-page original graphic novel by Joshua Quagmire, Milton Knight, and Leslie Cabarga. In 2016, Dynamite Entertainment published new Betty Boop comics with 20 pages in the alternative American anime graphic novel style.

Merchandise
Marketers rediscovered Betty Boop in the 1980s, and Betty Boop merchandise has far outdistanced her exposure in films, with many not aware of her as a cinematic creation. Much of this current merchandise features the character in her popular, sexier form, and has become popular worldwide once again.

In 2010, Betty Boop became the official fantasy cheerleader for the upstart United Football League. She was featured in merchandise targeted towards the league's female demographic.

As of 2021, international licensing company Global Icons has acquired the licensing rights to Betty Boop and other Fleischer Studios characters, thus ending Fleischer's longtime relationship with King Features Syndicate. She still appears in merchandise and social media, appealing to a 21st century audience, using slang from the social media website TikTok, and she has various hobbies. (cyclist, recycling, etc.)

Legal issues

Helen Kane lawsuit

In May 1932, Helen Kane filed a $250,000 infringement lawsuit against Max Fleischer and Paramount Publix Corporation for the "deliberate caricature" that produced "unfair competition", exploiting her personality and image. While Kane had risen to fame in the late 1920s as "The Boop-Oop-a-Doop Girl", a star of stage, recordings, and films for Paramount, her career was nearing its end by 1931. Paramount promoted the development of Betty Boop following Kane's decline. The case was brought in New York in 1934. On April 19, Fleischer testified that Betty Boop purely was a product of the imaginations of himself and detailed by members of his staff.

Theatrical manager Lou Bolton testified that Kane had witnessed an African-American performer, Baby Esther (Esther Jones), using a similar vocal style in an act at the Everglades Restaurant club in midtown Manhattan, in "April or May 1928". Under cross-examination Bolton said that he had met with Kane at the club after Esther's performance, but could not say when she had walked in. Bolton also stated that Fleischer's lawyers had paid him $200 to come to New York.  Baby Esther's name was given in the trial as Esther Jones. (During the trial, Lou Bolton, who was Esther Jones' manager, also testified his belief that she was probably in Paris.) An early test sound film, now lost, was also discovered, which featured Baby Esther performing in this style, which was introduced as evidence.  In the film, Baby Esther sings three songs that had earlier been popularized by Helen Kane – "Don’t Be Like That", "Is There Anything Wrong with That?", and "Wa-da-da" – which writer Mark Langer says "was hardly proof that Helen Kane derived her singing style from Baby Esther".  Jazz studies scholar Robert O'Meally stated this evidence, though, might very well have been cooked up by the Fleischers to discredit Kane, whom they later admitted to have been their model for Betty Boop.  O'Meally also questioned if some sort of deal existed between Fleischer Studios and Bolton, and questioned if Esther were ever paid for her presumed loss of revenue.  

New York Supreme Court Justice Edward J. McGoldrick ruled, "The plaintiff has failed to sustain either cause of action by proof of sufficient probative force". In his opinion, based on the totality of the evidence presented in the trial, the "baby" technique of singing did not originate with Kane. No confirmed recordings of Jones are known to exist.

Lawsuits and current ownership

Ownership of the Boop cartoons has changed hands over the intervening decades due to a series of corporate mergers, acquisitions, and divestitures mainly involving Republic Pictures and the 2006 corporate split of parent company Viacom into two separate companies. As of the present, Olive Films (under license from Paramount) holds home video rights and Trifecta retains television rights.

The rights to the "Betty Boop" character were not sold with the cartoons by Paramount, but were transferred to Harvey Films, Inc. in 1958, according to a 2011 US Court verdict. The courts, however, were unable to come to a majority decision concerning current ownership of the copyright. A trademark on the name (but not legitimately the likeness) of Betty Boop is owned by Fleischer Studios, for which the character was created in the 1930s, but which was unable to claim copyright infringement in a 2008 district court case; the merchandising rights to Betty's name were licensed to King Features Syndicate, but are now owned by Global Icons Inc.

Legacy and revivals
Betty Boop's popularity has continued into popular culture. In the Green Acres episode "School Days", Oliver quips that Lisa "has a lot of Betty Boop in her". In in the comic strip Doonesbury, B.D.'s busty girlfriend/wife is named "Boopsie". In Drawn Together, Betty is the inspiration for Toot Braunstein. Rapper Betty Boo based her voice and image on Betty Boop. The 1933 Betty Boop cartoon Snow-White (not to be confused with Snow White and the Seven Dwarfs) was selected for preservation by the U.S. Library of Congress in the National Film Registry in 1994. Betty appears in the Ink and Paint club scene in Who Framed Roger Rabbit. Betty is parodied in the Animaniacs episode "Girl with the Googily Goop", with the Boop character called "Googi Goop". The episode, made predominantly in black and white, is also a parody of "Little Red Riding Hood". Googi was voiced by one-time Betty Boop voice actress Desirée Goyette. Beatress Johnson, a character in American Mary, has had extensive plastic surgery to resemble Betty Boop. Betty Boop appeared with model Daria Werbowy in a commercial for Lancôme's Hypnôse Star Mascara, directed by Joann Sfar. In March, 2017, Betty appeared with fashion designer Zac Posen in an animated promotional short produced by King Features Syndicate, Fleischer Studios (its subsidiary) and Pantone.

In April 2011, Funny or Die parodied the character in a trailer spoof for a film called Boop, with Rose McGowan as Betty.

Betty Boop is a central character in the satirical parody webcomic Mr. Boop. The comic centers on the relationship between Betty and a fictionalized version of the webcomic's creator who is married to Betty. The comic was nominated for an Ignatz Award.

Accolades
 In 2002, Betty was voted in TV Guides 50 greatest cartoon characters of all time, ranking #17.
 In 2004, Betty Boop was voted among the "100 Greatest Cartoons" in a poll conducted by the British television channel Channel 4, ranking at #96.
 In March 2009, a UK newspaper voted Betty Boop the second sexiest cartoon character of all time, with Jessica Rabbit in first place and the Cadbury's Caramel Bunny in third.
 In August 2010, the inaugural Betty Boop Festival was held in the city of Wisconsin Rapids, Wisconsin, and the second Festival was held in July 2011.

Filmography

References
Notes

Citations

Bibliography
 Pointer, Ray (2017) The Art and Inventions of Max Fleischer: American Animation Pioneer North Carolina: McFarland Books. 
 Taylor, James D. Jr. (2017) Helen Kane and Betty Boop. On Stage and On Trial. New York: Algora Publishing. 

Further reading
 Betty Boop: The Definitive Collection, Volumes 1–8 (VHS)
 Ellis, Leonard (2003). The Definitive Guide to Betty Boop Memorabilia, Hobby House Press . 144 pages, softcover.  Hundreds of pictures and description of memorabilia.
 Solomon, Charles (1994). The History of Animation: Enchanted Drawings. Outlet Books Company.
 Taylor, James D. Jr. (2016) The Voice of Betty Boop, Mae Questel. New York: Algora Publishing.

External links

List of public domain Betty Boop cartoons online

Betty Boop at Don Markstein's Toonopedia. Archived from the original on February 22, 2018.
Betty Goes A-Posen (promotional short for Zac Posen dresses)

 
1934 comics debuts
American comic strips
American comics characters
Animated film series
Animated human characters
Comedy film characters
Articles containing video clips
Comics about women
Female characters in animation
Film characters introduced in 1930
Fictional models
Fictional presidents of the United States
Fictional singers
Film series introduced in 1932
Fleischer Studios series and characters
Television series by U.M. & M. TV Corporation
Animation controversies
Film controversies
Obscenity controversies in film
Obscenity controversies in animation
Flappers